Dial M was a public service talk show aired on NBN (now PTV) from 1996 to 1998 and from 2003 to 2010 and it was later aired on IBC in 2010. It was simulcasted on DZRJ 810 AM. It airs Tuesday and Thursday evenings. It requires your comments and suggestions live.

Hosts

Former MTRCB Chairman & Former PCSO Chairman Manoling Morato+
Actress Maggie Dela Riva

See also
List of programs aired by People's Television Network
List of programs previously broadcast by Intercontinental Broadcasting Corporation

External links
 Philippine Charity Sweepstakes Office 

1996 Philippine television series debuts
1998 Philippine television series endings
2003 Philippine television series debuts
2010 Philippine television series endings
1990s Philippine television series
People's Television Network original programming
IBC News and Public Affairs shows
Intercontinental Broadcasting Corporation original programming
Philippine television talk shows
Filipino-language television shows